John Bull (1803February 1863) was an American clergyman and physician who represented Missouri in the U.S. Congress between 1833 and 1835.

Life
He was born in Virginia, studied medicine in Baltimore, Maryland, moved to Howard County, Missouri, and settled near Glasgow, Missouri. He engaged in the practice of medicine. He owned slaves. He studied theology, was ordained to the ministry and became a Methodist minister in Glasgow, Missouri. He was an unsuccessful candidate in the 1832 Missouri gubernatorial election and a presidential elector on the Jackson-Calhoun ticket in 1828.

John Bull was elected as an Anti-Jacksonian candidate to the Twenty-third Congress (March 4, 1833 – March 3, 1835); resumed his ministerial duties and also the practice of medicine; died near Rothville, Missouri, Chariton County, Missouri, in February 1863; interment in Hutcheson Cemetery, a family burial ground, near Rothville.

External links

|-

1803 births
1863 deaths
Virginia politicians
Methodists from Virginia
Methodists from Missouri
American Methodist clergy
National Republican Party members of the United States House of Representatives from Missouri
1828 United States presidential electors
Physicians from Missouri
American slave owners
People from Glasgow, Missouri
19th-century American physicians
19th-century Methodist ministers
19th-century American clergy